María Jubilia Fernández Bustamante (11 September 1938 – 10 July 2014), better known as Juby Bustamante, was a Spanish journalist.

Career
She specialized in cultural journalism, although she worked in other fields, becoming a distinguished voice of the Spanish transition to democracy. In the words of journalist Nativel Preciado, "she was a fascinating narrator and had a strong literary style."

She worked at the daily , closed in 1971 by the dictatorship of General Franco. From there she went to the magazine Cambio 16 where she was part of the founding team of Diario 16. She left the newspaper in 1982 to join the Ministry of Culture as Javier Solana's press officer during the Felipe González administration, where she stayed until 1988. With the arrival of Jorge Semprún to the ministry, she became its cabinet director. After her retirement in 1991, she was appointed director of communication for the Thyssen-Bornemisza Foundation where she remained until her retirement in 2006.

She was the wife of journalist  and mother of two children, Miguel and Andrea.

Acknowledgments

References

1938 births
2014 deaths
20th-century Spanish women writers
People from Santander, Spain
Spanish journalists
Spanish women journalists